John Edwin Black (born 25 July 1951) is a former New Zealand rugby union player. A hooker, Black represented Canterbury at a provincial level, and was a member of the New Zealand national side, the All Blacks, from 1976 to 1980. He played 26 matches for the All Blacks including three internationals.

References

1951 births
Living people
Rugby union players from Timaru
People educated at Timaru Boys' High School
University of Canterbury alumni
New Zealand rugby union players
New Zealand international rugby union players
Canterbury rugby union players
Rugby union hookers